Lennart Hedquist (born 1943) is a Swedish politician of the Moderate Party. He has been a member of the Riksdag since 1994 and a replacement member of the Riksdag between 1991 and 1994.

External links
Riksdagen: Lennart Hedquist (m)

Members of the Riksdag from the Moderate Party
Living people
1943 births
Members of the Riksdag 2002–2006
Place of birth missing (living people)
Date of birth missing (living people)